Qadhi Abdullah al-Hajjri (1911–10 April 1977) was the Prime Minister of the Yemen Arab Republic from 30 December 1972 until 10 April 1974.  He was appointed by President Abdul Rahman al-Iryani.

He was assassinated in London on April 10, 1977, along with his wife Fatmiah and the minister plenipotentiary of North Yemen's embassy. All three were shot in their car outside the Royal Lancaster Hotel near Hyde Park. Hajri's killer has never been identified, though a report in a Palestinian newspaper named one of the hijackers of Lufthansa Flight 181 as being wanted in connection with the killing.

References

1911 births
1977 deaths
Prime Ministers of North Yemen
Assassinated Yemeni politicians
Yemeni people murdered abroad
People murdered in London
Deaths by firearm in London
Assassinations in the United Kingdom